The county of Cumbria is divided into 6 parliamentary constituencies: 1 borough constituency for the City of Carlisle and 5 county constituencies.

Constituencies

2010 boundary changes
Under the Fifth Periodic Review of Westminster constituencies, the Boundary Commission for England decided to retain Cumbria's constituencies for the 2010 election, making minor changes to realign constituency boundaries with the boundaries of current local government wards, and to reduce the electoral disparity between constituencies.

Proposed boundary changes 
See 2023 Periodic Review of Westminster constituencies for further details.

Following the abandonment of the Sixth Periodic Review (the 2018 review), the Boundary Commission for England formally launched the 2023 Review on 5 January 2021. Initial proposals were published on 8 June 2021 and, following two periods of public consultation, revised proposals were published on 8 November 2022. Final proposals will be published by 1 July 2023.

The commission has proposed that Cumbria be combined with Lancashire as a sub-region of the North West Region, with the existing seat of Morecambe and Lonsdale extending into southern Cumbria to create a cross-county boundary constituency. Copeland, Penrith and The Border, and Workington are abolished and replaced by the new constituencies of Penrith and Solway, and Whitehaven and Workington.

The following constituencies are proposed:

Containing electoral wards from Allerdale

 Penrith and Solway (part)
 Whitehaven and Workington (part)

Containing electoral wards from Barrow-in-Furness
Barrow and Furness (part)
Containing electoral wards from Carlisle
Carlisle
Penrith and Solway (part)
Containing electoral wards from Copeland

 Barrow and Furness (part)
 Whitehaven and Workington (part)

Containing electoral wards from Eden

 Penrith and Solway (part)
 Westmorland and Lonsdale (part)

Containing electoral wards from South Lakeland

 Barrow and Furness (part)
Morecambe and Lonsdale (part also in Lancaster in Lancashire)
Westmorland and Lonsdale (part)

Results history
Primary data source: House of Commons research briefing - General election results from 1918 to 2019

2019 
The number of votes cast for each political party who fielded candidates in constituencies comprising Cumbria in the 2019 general election were as follows:

Percentage votes 

11983 & 1987 - SDP-Liberal Alliance

* Included in Other

Seats 

11983 & 1987 - SDP-Liberal Alliance

Maps 

Before 1983, Cumberland and Westmorland shown separately.

Historical representation by party
A cell marked → (with a different colour background to the preceding cell) indicates that the previous MP continued to sit under a new party name.

1885 to 1918

1918 to 1950

1950 to 1983

1983 to present

See also
 List of parliamentary constituencies in the North West (region)
 List of United Kingdom Parliament constituencies

Notes

References

Cumbria

Parliamentary constituencies